Shore Farm, historically known as "Shore Farm Camp," is a historic farm complex located at Hounsfield in Jefferson County, New York. The farm complex consists of the Luff/Wardwell House, a former tenant house/milk house, and a cattle barn.  The house is a stone and wood-frame structure dating to about 1822 and enlarged about 1895.  Also on the property are non-contributing cabins and cottages.

It was listed on the National Register of Historic Places in 1989.

References

Houses on the National Register of Historic Places in New York (state)
Houses completed in 1822
Houses in Jefferson County, New York
National Register of Historic Places in Jefferson County, New York
1822 establishments in New York (state)